Walcott Street is an important east–west road in the inner northern suburbs of Perth, Western Australia, linking four of Perth's major northern road corridors (Charles Street, Alexander Drive, Beaufort Street and Guildford Road). It is a four-lane road for its entire length.

References

Streets in North Perth, Western Australia
Roads in Perth, Western Australia
North Perth, Western Australia
Mount Lawley, Western Australia